The 1960 New Zealand rugby union tour of South Africa, was a series of rugby union match played by New Zealand national rugby union team (the All Blacks) in South Africa and Rhodesia.

It was a very controversial tour, because the South African authorities imposed the exclusion of Maori players from the team. This racist policy created much controversy in New Zealand.  (see Halt All Racist Tours)

Later tours
New Zealand Rugby union then refused any other tour for the successive ten years until Maori and Samoan player participation was accepted in 1970. In that occasion South African authorities, gave them the title of "Honorary Whites", but controversies remained. In 1976, all the African countries boycotted the Olympic Games in protest at the All Blacks' tour of South Africa.

Then, the 1981 Springboks' tour, was contested by a large part of New Zealand public opinion, with riots and demonstrations.

In 1985 public opinion convinced NZRU to cancel another tour in South Africa. Only with the end of apartheid, in 1992 did the controversy end.

Also outside the political troubles, the results of the tour wasn't good in any case for All Blacks, that lost the series with only a victory and a draw in the four-match series against the Springboks

Results

In Australia 

No test match was played.

Scores and results list All Blacks' points tally first.

In Africa 
Scores and results list All Blacks' points tally first.

Notes

External links 
New Zealand in Australia and South Africa 1960 from rugbymuseum.co.nz

New Zealand tour
Australia tour
New Zealand national rugby union team tours of Australia
New Zealand national rugby union team tours of South Africa
1960 in South African rugby union